Dysdercus mimulus is a species of red bug in the family Pyrrhocoridae. It is found in the Caribbean, Central America, and North America.

Subspecies
These two subspecies belong to the species Dysdercus mimulus:
 Dysdercus mimulus luteus Doesburg, 1968
 Dysdercus mimulus mimulus Hussey, 1929

References

Pyrrhocoridae
Articles created by Qbugbot
Insects described in 1929